Kahn is a surname of German origin. Kahn means "small boat", in German. It is also a Germanized form of the Jewish surname Cohen, another variant of which is Cahn.

People with the personal name Kahn
 Kahn Fotuali'i (born 1982), New Zealand rugby-union player of Samoan origin
Kahn Singh Nabha (1861–1938), Punjabi Sikh scholar, writer, anthologist, lexicographer, and encyclopedist

People with the surname Kahn 
 Albert Kahn  (1860–1940), French banker and philanthropist
 Albert Kahn (1869–1942), American industrial architect
 Albert E. Kahn  (1912–1979), American journalist
 Alex Kahn (born 1967), American artist
Alexander Kahn (1881–1962), American lawyer and newspaper editor
 Alfred E. Kahn (1917–2010), American economist
 Alfred R. Kahn (born 1947), American businessman, CEO of 4Kids Entertainment
 Ashley Kahn, American jazz historian
 Aunia Kahn (born 1977), American artist
 Axel Kahn (1944–2021), French geneticist 
 Barbara B. Kahn, American endocrinologist and professor
 Bob Kahn (born 1938), American developer of the TCP and IP protocols
 Brian Kahn, American writer and radio host
 Brenda Kahn (born 1967), American singer-songwriter
 Charles H. Kahn, professor of philosophy at the University of Pennsylvania 
 Charles N. Kahn III (born 1952), president and chief executive officer of the Federation of American Hospitals
 C. Ronald Kahn (born 1944), American physician and scientist
 David Kahn (born 1930), American historian, journalist and writer
 David Kahn (born 1961), American sports executive, former G.M. of the Minnesota Timberwolves
 Dominique Strauss-Kahn (born 1949), French former managing director of the International Monetary Fund (IMF)
 Emilie Kahn, Canadian musician
 Ely Jacques Kahn  (1884–1972), American commercial architect
 Gilles Kahn (1946–2006), French computer scientist, described Kahn process networks
 Gus Kahn (1886–1941), American musician and songwriter
 Gustave Kahn (1859–1936), French poet
 Hannah Kahn (1911–1988), American poet, born in New York City
 Harold L. Kahn (1930–2018), American historian
 Herman Kahn (1922–1983), American military theorist and futurologist
 Irving Kahn (1905–2015), American investor
 Israel Kahn (born 1988), Peruvian footballer
 Jean-François Kahn (born 1938), French journalist
 Jeff Kahn, American mathematician at Rutgers University
 Jenette Kahn (born 1947), American comic book editor
 Julius Kahn (1861–1924), United States congressman
 Larry Kahn, American tiddlywinks champion
 Lehman Kahn (1827–1915), Belgian educationalist and writer
 Lisa B. Kahn, American economist
 Lisa M. Kahn (1921–2013), German-American scholar and poet
 Lloyd Kahn (born 1935), American publisher and author
 Louis Kahn (1901–1974), American architect
 Lucian Kahn (born 1982), American singer, songwriter and guitarist of Schmekel
 Lucille Kahn (1902–1995), American actress and parapsychology advocate
 Madeline Kahn (1942–1999), American actress 
 Michael Kahn (born 1935), American film editor
 Oliver Kahn (born 1969), German former footballer
 Otto Hermann Kahn (1867–1934), German-born American banker and patron of the arts
 Paul W. Kahn (born 1952), professor at Yale Law School
 Philippe Kahn (born 1952), French-born American entrepreneur
 Reuben Leon Kahn (1887–1979), Lithuanian physician
 Richard Ferdinand Kahn (1905–1989), English economist
 Robert Kahn (1865–1951), German composer
 Robert Louis Kahn (1918–2019), psychologist and social scientist
 Robert Ludwig Kahn (1923–1970), professor of German studies and poet
 Roger Kahn (born 1927), American author and sports journalist
 Roger Wolfe Kahn (1907–1962), American jazz musician
 Ruth Ward Kahn (1872–?), American writer
 Sam Kahn (1911–1987), South African anti-apartheid politician, activist and lawyer
 Tom Kahn (1938–1992), American social-democrat, civil-rights leader, and labor-union officer
 Yoel Kahn (1930–2021), American, Chabad rabbi
 Zadoc Kahn (1839–1905), Alsatian-French, chief rabbi of France

Fictional characters 
 Kahn Souphanousinphone, Hank Hill's neighbor in the television cartoon series King of the Hill
 Shao Kahn, in the Mortal Kombat universe
 Kotal Kahn, playable character in "Mortal Kombat X"
 Commander Kahn, a character in the 2006 rhythm game Elite Beat Agents
 Noel Kahn, in the American TV series Pretty Little Liars

See also 
 Khan (name), title and surname in Central and South Asia
 Kan (surname)
 Caan (disambiguation); Kaan (disambiguation)
 Cann (disambiguation); Kann (disambiguation)

References

German-language surnames
Jewish families
Kohenitic surnames
Jewish surnames
Yiddish-language surnames